The women's sanda 52 kilograms competition at the 2018 Asian Games in Jakarta, Indonesia was held from 19 August to 23 August at the JIExpo Kemayoran Hall B3.

A total of thirteen competitors from thirteen different countries (NOCs) competed in this event, limited to fighters whose body weight was less than 52 kilograms.

Li Yueyao from China won the gold medal after beating her opponent Elaheh Mansourian of Iran in gold medal bout 2–0, Li won the first round 5–0 and she finished the match in second round after throwing Mansourian out of the platform twice. Li won the gold medal without losing a single round in the entire competition.

The bronze medal was shared by both semifinal losers, Divine Wally from the Philippines and Chen Wei-ting from Chinese Taipei (Taiwan).

Schedule
All times are Western Indonesia Time (UTC+07:00)

Results
Legend
PD — Won by gap point

References

External links
Official website

Women's sanda 52 kg